Edward Ballinger (born October 25, 1951) is an American fencer. He competed in the individual and team foil events at the 1976 Summer Olympics. He is married to Sally Pechinsky. He is retired from coaching at the Boston Fencing Club. He was elected for induction into the USFA Hall of Fame in the summer of 2012.

See also
List of USFA Division I National Champions

References

External links
 

1951 births
Living people
American male épée fencers
Olympic fencers of the United States
Fencers at the 1976 Summer Olympics
Sportspeople from New York City
Pan American Games medalists in fencing
Pan American Games silver medalists for the United States
Fencers at the 1975 Pan American Games
American male foil fencers
20th-century American people
21st-century American people